Senator Todd may refer to:

Andrew L. Todd Sr. (1872–1945), Tennessee State Senate
Nancy Todd (born 1948), Colorado State Senate
Robert Smith Todd (1791–1849), Kentucky State Senate
Robert Todd (pioneer) (died 1814), Kentucky State Senate
S. J. Todd (1821–1902), Wisconsin State Senate
Walker Todd (1780s–1840), New York State Senate

See also
Senator Tod (disambiguation)